Niezdrowice  is a village in the administrative district of Gmina Ujazd, within Strzelce County, Opole Voivodeship, in south-western Poland.

The village has a population of 605.

The history of the village dates back to medieval Poland. Its name comes from the Polish words nie zdrowy ("not healthy"). Between 1871 and 1945 it was part of Germany. In 1936, during a massive Nazi campaign of renaming of placenames, it was renamed Neubrücken to remove traces of Polish origin. In the final stages of World War II, in January 1945, the Germans executed a group of prisoners of the Auschwitz concentration camp in the village. After the war the village became again part of Poland and its original name was restored.

Gallery

References

External links 
 Jewish Community in Niezdrowice on Virtual Shtetl

Niezdrowice